Antonín 'Toni' Kasper (5 December 1962 in Prague, Czechoslovakia – 31 July 2006) was an international motorcycle speedway rider who appeared in four Speedway World Championship finals and featured in four Speedway Grand Prix series.

Career
Kasper won the 1982 European Under-21 Championship at the Rottalstadion in Pocking, West Germany. On 25 July 1998 he won the Continental Final, which formed part of the 1999 Speedway Grand Prix Qualification.

Kasper rode in the UK for the Hackney Hawks from 1982 until their closure the following season at the end of 1983. He rode for Karlstad in Sweden in 1991.

In 2005 Toni was diagnosed with cancer, and he died in 2006.

As a child actor he appeared in two Czech films.

Family
His father Antonín Kasper Sr. also appeared in Speedway World Championship finals.

World Final appearances

Individual World Championship
 1983 –  Norden, Motodrom Halbemond – 14th – 3 points
 1986 –  Chorzów, Silesian Stadium – 14th – 2 pts
 1987 –  Amsterdam Olympic Stadium – 12th – 9 pts
 1990 –  Bradford, Odsal Stadium – 15th – 2 pts

World Team Cup
 1982 –  London, White City Stadium (with Jiří Štancl / Aleš Dryml / Václav Verner / Petr Ondrašík) – 4th – 17 pts (0)
 1983 –  Vojens, Speedway Center (with Jiří Štancl / Aleš Dryml / Václav Verner / Petr Ondrašík) – 4th – 3 pts (0)
 1987 -  Fredericia, Fredericia Speedway,  Coventry, Brandon Stadium,  Prague, Markéta Stadium (with Roman Matoušek / Petr Vandirek / Lubomir Jedek / Zdenek Schneiderwind) - 4th - 36pts (10)

World Pairs Championship
 1986 -  Pocking, Rottalstadion (with Roman Matoušek) - 3rd - 32pts
 1987 -  Pardubice, Svítkov Stadion (with Roman Matoušek) - 5th - 30 pts

Speedway Grand Prix results

References 

1962 births
2006 deaths
Czechoslovak speedway riders
Czech speedway riders
Hackney Hawks riders
Czech male child actors